Churuja District is one of twelve districts of the province Bongará in Peru.

References

1944 establishments in Peru
States and territories established in 1944
Districts of the Bongará Province
Districts of the Amazonas Region